Harpalus capito is a species of ground beetle in the subfamily Harpalinae. It was described by A.Morawitz in 1862.

References

capito
Beetles described in 1862